Stockbridge High School is a high school located in Stockbridge, Georgia, United States, in the Henry County School District. It enrolls around 1,800 students in grades 9–12.

Principals
 Coy Pridmore, 1964 - 1983
 Sam Floyd, 1984 - 1987
 Gary Boehmer 1987 - 1993
 Bill Eaves, 1993 - 2002
 Antonio Hurt, 2002 - 2005
 Eric Watson, 2005 - 2023
 James Thornton, 2023 - present

Championships and sports
 1981 - Stockbridge Varsity Wrestling Team; 10–0; first team in Stockbridge HS history to go undefeated 
 2001 - AAAAA Wrestling Team produced four state placers: 
 2006 - AAAA State Elite Eight, boys' tennis
 2007 - AAAA Traditional and Team duals state champions, first and only state championship team in school history having six placers
 2013 - Football Varsity State Championships; Stockbridge High School beat Union Grove HS (49-6);* 2014 - 4-AAAAA Region Champs, Semi-Finals
 2015 - 4-AAAAA Region Champs, Quarterfinals 
 2016 - 4-AAAAA Region Champs, Semi-Finals
 2017 - 4-AAAA Sub-Region Champs, Quarterfinals
 2018 - 4-AAAAA Region Champs, Semi-Finals

Notable alumni
 Kyle Davies - starting pitcher for the Kansas City Royals (formerly of the Atlanta Braves), class of 2001
 Michael Harris II outfielder for the Atlanta Braves
 Bruce Irvin - Seattle Seahawks 2012 first round pick; transferred during his junior year
 Ed Roland - lead singer of Collective Soul
 Terry Turner - television writer and screenwriter, best known with his wife Bonnie as the creators of popular television shows 3rd Rock from the Sun and That '70s Show, and writers of Tommy Boy, Wayne's World, and Coneheads, class of 1966
 Ken Webster - Drafted by the New England Patriots in the 7th round, pick 38
 Southside - record producer

References

External links
 Stockbridge High School

Educational institutions established in 1964
Public high schools in Georgia (U.S. state)
Schools in Henry County, Georgia
Stockbridge, Georgia
1964 establishments in Georgia (U.S. state)